In algebraic geometry, the Igusa quartic (also called the Castelnuovo–Richmond quartic  CR4 or the Castelnuovo–Richmond–Igusa quartic) is a quartic hypersurface in 4-dimensional projective space, studied by .
It is closely related to the moduli space of genus 2 curves with level 2 structure. It is the dual of the Segre cubic.

It can be given as a codimension 2 variety in P5 by the equations

References

 

3-folds